Eenam Thettaatha Kaattaaru  is a 1989 Indian Malayalam film, directed by P. Vinod Kumar, starring Sukumaran and Jayalalita in the lead roles.

Cast
 Sukumaran as Jayan
 Jayalalita as Neeli
 Cochin Haneefa as George	
 Viji as Ponni
 Veena Sunder 
 Ganesh Kumar as Rajesh
 Shanawas as Maruthan
Hari as Kattumooppan
Radha Devi

Soundtrack 

Music was by Navas Rahman, with lyrics by Poovachal Khader.

References

External links

see the movie
 Eenam Thettatha Kattaru 1989

1989 films
1980s Malayalam-language films